
The Peshawari chappal (Urdu: پیشاوری چپل) is a traditional type of footwear of Pashtuns, worn especially by Pashtuns in the Khyber Pakhtunkhwa region. The shoe takes its name from the city of Peshawar, where it originates. While chappal is the word for flip-flops or sandals in Urdu, locals in Peshawar call the Peshawari Tsaplay (Pashto: څپلی ). The shoes are worn by men casually or formally, usually with the shalwar kameez. Because of their comfort, they are worn in place of sandals or slippers in Pakistan.

Description 

It is a semi-closed shoe which consists of two wide straps crossed and joined with the sole, plus a heel strap with a buckle to tie according to the foot size and level of comfort. It is traditionally made with pure leather with its sole often made from a truck tyre. It is available in many traditional designs and colours with various variations such as gold and silver embroidery, which give the shoe a more elegant look. Peshawari chappals have become increasingly popular in other parts of Pakistan; even wearing them with jeans has become a fashion trend, especially among urban youth. With increased availability through e-commerce websites, they are now appearing in new designs in many cities of Pakistan and Dubai.

Peshawari chappals are made from soft leather which is sewn onto the rubber tire sole. The materials are cheap, easily available and very hard-wearing. Intricate designs are added to the leather upper before the shoe is put into a mold which stretches it to size.

History 
In March 2014, the Peshawari chappal became the Centre of a global fashion debate when Sir Paul Smith made a similar shoe, which sold for £300. This prompted complaints on social media that the design appropriated the culture and craft of its original Pakistan makers. Over a thousand petitioners used Change.org to ask the designer and U.K. government for remedy. As a result, the shoe's description on the Paul Smith website was changed to read that it was "inspired by Peshawari Chappal".

A new version of the chappal known as 'Kaptaan Chappal' became very popular after it was gifted to Imran Khan in 2015. In 2019 the creator of the chappal had to pay a Rs. 50,000 fine for making snakeskin chappals.

Peshawari chappals for women 
Although traditionally worn by the men of the region, the shoe style has piqued the interest of Pakistani women. After Nooruddin Shinwari presented the pair to Imran Khan, Khan's then wife Reham Khan said she would like a pair for herself. Many fashion brands in Pakistan, such as Mochari and Chapter 13, have started making Peshawai chappals for women.

See also
 Pashtun dress
 Pakistani dress
 Peshawari Pagri

References

External links
 
 

Folk footwear
Pakistani footwear
Peshawar
Pashtun culture
Economy of Peshawar